Walter Otto Dreyer (February 25, 1923 – September 27, 2002) was an American football player and coach He played professionally as a defensive back and halfback in the National Football League (NFL) for the Chicago Bears (1949) and the Green Bay Packers (1950–1951). Dreyer played college football at the University of Wisconsin–Madison and the University of Michigan. He served as the head football coach at the University of Wisconsin–Milwaukee from  1960 to 1969.

Coaching career
Dreyer began his coaching career in 1952 as head football coach at Berlin High School in Berlin, Wisconsin. A year later, he moved to Rufus King High School in Milwaukee, where he compiled a record of 39–15–2 in seven seasons as head football coach and led his teams to three city conference titles.

Head coaching record

College

See also
 List of Chicago Bears players
 List of Green Bay Packers players

References

External links
 
 

1923 births
2002 deaths
American football defensive backs
American football halfbacks
Chicago Bears players
Green Bay Packers players
Michigan Wolverines football players
Milwaukee Panthers football coaches
Wisconsin Badgers football players
High school football coaches in Wisconsin
Coaches of American football from Wisconsin
Players of American football from Milwaukee